Davide Adorni (born 9 August 1992) is an Italian footballer who plays as a defender for Italian Serie B club Brescia.

Career
Born in Parma, Emilia region, Adorni started his career at hometown club Parma F.C. He was the member of the under-17 youth team in 2008–09 season. He spent 3 seasons with Parma reserve from 2009 to 2012. He made 30 league appearances only.

Adorni left for partner club Renate on 4 July 2012 along with fellow youth product Miloš Malivojević, Antonio Santurro and Emiliano Storani.

Cesena
On 29 June 2013 half of the registration rights of Adorni were exchanged with half of the card of Marco Paolini from Cesena. Adorni signed a 4-year contract. On 5 July 2013 the loan of Adorni and Santurro were renewed from Parma. Renate also signed Matteo Cincilla and Filippo Lauricella from Parma reserve. In June 2014 Adorni and Paolini were signed by Cesena and Parma outright.

Santarcangelo
In January 2015 Adorni joined Santarcangelo in a temporary deal. In summer 2015 the loan was extended. On 3 August 2016 the loan was extended again, with an obligation to sign him outright at the end of season. Santarcangelo also signed Matteo Ronchi and Salvatore Maiorana on the same day from Cesena.

Cittadella
On 18 July 2017 Adorni was signed by Cittadella.

Brescia
On 31 January 2022, Adorni joined Brescia.

References

External links
 AIC profile (data by football.it) 
 

Italian footballers
Parma Calcio 1913 players
A.C. Renate players
A.C. Cesena players
A.S. Cittadella players
Brescia Calcio players
Serie B players
Serie C players
Association football defenders
Sportspeople from Parma
Living people
1992 births
Footballers from Emilia-Romagna